Sri Lanka Law College (abbreviated as SLLC), formerly known as Ceylon Law College, is a law college, and the only legal institution where one can enroll as a attorney-at-law in Sri Lanka. It was established in 1874, under the then Council of Legal Education, in order to impart a formal legal education to those who wished to become advocates and proctors in Ceylon. The main building of the college was constructed in 1911. It is located on Hulftsdorp Street in Colombo, Sri Lanka. As of late 2021, the current principal is Dr. Athula Pathinayake.

Law education
In order to practice law in Sri Lanka, a lawyer must be admitted and enrolled as an Attorney-At-Law of the Supreme Court. To receive admission to the bar, a law student must complete law exams held by the SLLC, followed by a practical training course combined with an apprenticeship, which is roughly 6 months.

Admission
There is a very competitive entrance examination held. It is held every August/ September. The subjects for the Entrance Exam are, 
 Language Paper – English/Sinhala/Tamil
 General Knowledge and General Intelligence paper.

Young Members of Parliament receive direct admission without setting for the entrance exam, and without higher educational qualifications.

Admission for LLB Graduates
LLB Graduates LLB from either a recognised state or foreign university will be eligible to enter without sitting for entrance examinations.

As of December 2020, LLB Graduates will also have to sit a Special Entrance Examination to gain entry, as stated in Extraordinary Gazette Number 2208/13 dated 30 December 2020.

Course of Study/Syllabus
The course of study at Sri Lanka Law College does not grant any degree or certification. However, once a student has completed all the examinations, and an apprenticeship (including practical training course), they are then qualified as individuals who can be admitted to the profession as an Attorney-At-Law.

There are 3 academic years; Preliminary, Intermediate, and Final Year. One must successfully pass 7-8 subjects for each academic year, with an overall average of over 50%, and a minimum of over 40% per subject. Resitting certain subjects are allowed conditionally (such as a high average).

As per the most recent Gazette, the Final Year will have to be conducted entirely in English, regardless of your selected language (Extraordinary Gazette Number 2208/13 dated 30 December 2020).

LLB Graduate Route
Graduates holding an LL.B. from either a recognised state or foreign university will be then required to complete several examinations, following which they will have to go through a period of apprenticeship to enrol as an Attorney-at-Law and be admitted to the bar. LLB Graduates are exempt from Attendance requirements and can optionally sit exams in both October and/or April.

Local University Graduates
LLB graduates from recognised state universities such as the University of Colombo, Open University of Sri Lanka, University of Jaffna, University of Peradeniya, and Kotelawala Defence University, only have to sit the Final Year examinations, entailing around 8 subjects.

Foreign University Graduates
However, Foreign LLB Graduates from the University of London, or other partnered foreign universities, have to sit for all 3 academic years. This rule was introduced in the last 10 years.

Re-qualifying from other Commonwealth countries
If one is a Foreign commonwealth lawyer, or a Barrister of England, Scotland and Ireland; they will only be required to sit for a few subjects. They will also have to take part in a Practical Training Course and serve the period of apprenticeship, unless they served a period of pupilage in the United Kingdom

Other Courses
The SLLC carries out several post-attorney courses including an LL.M. from the University of Wales and post-attorney diplomas in intellectual property law and international trade law.

Student unions

The Law Students' Union of Sri Lanka (LSU)

The Law Students' Union was founded in 1894 as the Ceylon Law Students' Union. The first president was Sir Ponnambalam Ramanathan. The first meeting was held on June 13, 1894.
With the implementation of the new rules in 1937, a student was elected as president of the L.S.U, rather than the previous practice where an experienced lawyer was appointed to that post. In 1970, the rules were further amended to give the student community greater control over their own affairs. Since that time another amendment was made creating the posts of Social and Welfare Secretary and that of editorial assistant. However, this amendment has not been put down in writing, and has been carried out by convention.

In 1991, the union amended its rules further to create the posts of Education Secretary and Assistant Education Secretary in order to protect and safeguard the educational necessities of the student community. The rules were also translated into Sinhala by the Law Students' Union of 1989 and 1991. In 1995 the rules were amended which resulted changing the name to the Law Students' Union of Sri Lanka. This amendment also created the law students' sports fund.

The Law Students' Sinhala Union of Sri Lanka (LSSU)

Sri Lanka Law College, which was established in 1874, is one of the oldest and leading professional educational institution of Sri Lanka and operating within it is the Law Students' Sinhala Union which can be introduced as one of the leading student unions with a history of dedicated service to law students for the past 73 years.

The law student Sinhala Union was established in 1943, in the wake of a renaissance against colonialism, when people irrespective of their race or religion joining hands together in the struggle for independence. Thus it was this Union that spearheaded the law students' contribution to this movement. The Law Students' Sinhala Union which was hence established was formalised and re-structured as an organised student union by C. Ananda Grero.

Notable alumni Dr. W. D. Rodrigo, President's Counsel, Former Principal of Sri Lanka Law College
As one of the oldest professional training bodies it has trained all the lawyers in the country who have served not only in the field of law but also various other fields such as politics, social reforms, commerce, trade unions and religion. For instance, two of the five Executive Presidents and Prime Minister Ranil Wickramasinghe had their higher education and training at the Sri Lanka Law College.

Partner universities
  University of Wales, United Kingdom
  University of London
  University of Colombo, Sri Lanka
  University of Peradeniya, Sri Lanka
  University of Jaffna, Sri Lanka
  Open University of Sri Lanka, Sri Lanka

See also
Sri Lankan universities

References

External links
 Official website
 Law College Entrance Exam

 
Universities and colleges in Colombo
Educational institutions established in 1874
1874 establishments in Ceylon